Fatou Dioup (born 5 May 1994) is a Mauritanian footballer who plays as a midfielder for Moroccan Féminine club ASSA Zag and the Mauritania national team.

Club career
Dioup has played for Strasbourg Vauban, Saint-Denis and ASSA Zag in Morocco.

International career
Dioup was capped for Mauritania at senior level during their first ever international match (friendly). She scored Mauritania's first-ever international goal.

Career statistics

International
Scores and results list Mauritania's goal tally first

See also
 List of Mauritania women's international footballers

References

1995 births
Living people
Mauritanian women's footballers
Women's association football midfielders
Mauritania women's international footballers